Ed, Edd n Eddy: Jawbreakers! is a 2D side-scrolling video game developed by Climax Group and published by BAM! Entertainment. It was released exclusively for the Game Boy Advance on September 15, 2002. Based on Cartoon Network's animated television series Ed, Edd n Eddy, the game mirrors Ed, Edd, and Eddy's television quest to make money to buy jawbreakers.

Cartoon Network later released Ed, Edd n Eddy: The Mis-Edventures in 2005 and Ed, Edd n Eddy: Scam of the Century in 2007.

Gameplay
Players control the Eds, the series' titular characters, to collect raffle tickets for competition in a contest to win a lifetime supply of jawbreakers. Ed, Double D, and Eddy use resourceful means to earn money, solve physical puzzles, interact with neighborhood children, and find hidden goodies. Ed can head-butt; Double D can use a slingshot or a wrench and activate context-sensitive switches; and Eddy can use the hypnotizing wheel or the jetpack. Players control one Ed at a time, each with his own unique strength and weakness, and may dynamically cycle through the three main characters. The game's 29 levels each offer a short animated cut-scene at the beginning and end.

Reception

The game received negative reviews among critics, with IGN'''s Craig Harris criticizing the game's lack of a tutorial. Others complained of lack of indication as to time necessary to complete levels coupled with each level's time limit. Harris also criticized the game's timing, as its blueprints are based on The Lost Vikings, which was shipped as a Game Boy Advance conversion only a week before Jawbreakers!''s release.

References

External links
 

2002 video games
Game Boy Advance games
Game Boy Advance-only games
Video games developed in the United Kingdom
Video games based on Ed, Edd n Eddy
Cartoon Network video games
Single-player video games